Vincent O'Sullivan (November 28, 1868 – July 18, 1940) was an American-born short story writer, poet and critic.

Biography
Born in New York City to Eugene and Christine O'Sullivan, he began his education in the New York public school system and completed it in Britain. he lived comfortably in London, travelling often to France, until in 1909 he lost his income from the family coffee business when his brother Percy made a spectacularly mistimed futures gamble at the New York Coffee Exchange. The entire family was ruined, and Vincent was destitute for the remaining years of his life. His works dealt with the morbid and decadent. He was a friend of Oscar Wilde (to whom in his disgrace he was often generous), Leonard Smithers, Aubrey Beardsley and other fin-de-siècle 
figures. O'Sullivan produced his first collection of supernatural fiction, A Book of Bargains, in 1896. It contains the pact-with the devil story "The Bargain of Rupert Orange", and The Business of Madame Jahn and "My Enemy and Myself", which both feature reanimated corpses. "When I Was Dead" (1905), "Verschoyle's House" (1915) and "The Burned House"  (1916) are ghost stories, while "Will"  is a tale of psychic vampirism.

Reception
Robert Aickman wrote of O'Sullivan that:

[his short story] "When I Was Dead" is a very rictus or spasm of guilt; sudden and shattering. Vincent O'Sullivan was a master of this dyeing and soaking in guilt. The curious should try to find a copy of his novel, The Good Girl. The quest is difficult, but the product distinctive. O'Sullivan, having lived a longish life as a more or less well-to-do rentier, in latish middle age found himself ruined, wrote his last book (Opinions) under terrible conditions, and, dying in Paris, ended anonymously in the common pit for the cadavers of paupers. 

John Cowper Powys listed The Good Girl at number 97 in his One Hundred Best Books. "This admirable work of art is not known as well as it deserves either in England or America," he said:

It is a work of genius in every sense of that word, and it produces on the mind that curious sense of completeness and finality which only such works produce... The author of this book must have a noble and formidable soul.

Works
 Poems (1896)
 A Book of Bargains (1896) 
 The Houses of Sin (1897)
 The Green Window (1899)
 A Dissertation Upon Second Fiddles (1902)
 Human Affairs (1907)
 The Good Girl (1912)
 Sentiment and Other Stories (1913)
 Aspects of Wilde (1936)
 Opinions (1959)

Notes

External links
 
 
 
 Works by Vincent O'Sullivan, at Hathi Trust
 
 
 An Irishman's Diary The Irish Times Tue, Apr 12, 2011

19th-century American novelists
20th-century American novelists
American male novelists
American horror writers
Ghost story writers
Writers from New York City
1868 births
1940 deaths
American male short story writers
20th-century American poets
American male poets
19th-century American short story writers
19th-century American male writers
20th-century American short story writers
20th-century American male writers
Novelists from New York (state)